"She's Not You" is a 1962 song recorded by Elvis Presley and released as a single on RCA Victor.

Background
The song was recorded on March 19, 1962. It was published by Elvis Presley Music, Inc., Elvis Presley's publishing company.

"She's Not You" reached No. 5 on the Billboard Hot 100 and No. 13 on the R&B chart. In the UK, the single reached No. 1 where it stayed for three weeks. It was also the first song on the new Irish Charts to reach number one on October 5, 1962.

It was written by Doc Pomus in collaboration with Leiber and Stoller.

The Jordanaires sang background vocals. It was released by Presley in the key of F major.

Episode 1 of the 2004 BBC miniseries Blackpool featured the Presley recording, accompanied on screen by the singing and dancing of the characters, as part of the story.

The recording appeared on the 1963 compilation Elvis' Golden Records Volume 3 and the 2002 career retrospective collection ELV1S: 30 No. 1 Hits.

Charts

Other recordings

Chris Isaak covered this song on his 2011 album, Beyond the Sun. The song has also been recorded by Ronnie McDowell, Ray Smith. Rupert, Con Archer, Merrill Osmond, and The 69 Cats with Wanda Jackson.

References

1962 singles
1962 songs
Elvis Presley songs
Songs with lyrics by Doc Pomus
UK Singles Chart number-one singles
Songs written by Jerry Leiber and Mike Stoller
Number-one singles in Norway
Irish Singles Chart number-one singles
Song recordings produced by Stephen H. Sholes
Song recordings produced by Chet Atkins
Pop ballads
1960s ballads